The Virginia Attorney General election of 2005 took place on November 8, 2005, to elect the Attorney General of Virginia. Jerry Kilgore, who had been elected attorney general in 2001, resigned in February 2005 to run for Governor, as is the tradition in Virginia. He was replaced by Judith Jagdmann, the Deputy Attorney General for the Civil Litigation Division, who did not run in the election.

The Republican primary was won by State Delegate Bob McDonnell, who defeated attorney Steve Baril. State Senator Creigh Deeds was unopposed in the Democratic primary. McDonnell won the race, which was so close it required a recount, by 360 votes  He was sworn in as Attorney General alongside Governor Tim Kaine and Lieutenant Governor Bill Bolling on January 14, 2006.

McDonnell and Deeds went on to rematch in the 2009 Virginia gubernatorial election, which McDonnell won by a wide margin.

Republican primary
The primary campaign was a contentious one. Baril accused McDonnell of bypassing campaign finance laws by taking hundreds of thousands of dollars in donations from clients he represented in cases in front of state agencies in his dual role as a "lawyer-legislator". McDonnell replied that the allegations were "baseless". Baril promised to be "the people's lawyer" and was endorsed by Eric Cantor. McDonnell, carrying Jim Gilmore's endorsement, cast himself as an experienced reformer.

Candidates

Declared
 Steve Baril, attorney
 Bob McDonnell, State Delegate

Results

Democratic primary
Roanoke State Senator John S. Edwards was to challenge Deeds in a primary fight for the Attorney General Nomination for the Democratic Party of Virginia. Edwards, who had won 30% of the vote in the primary in 2001, was considered a viable candidate, but inevitably dropped out due to his tough liberal stances on Gay Rights. After Edwards' withdrawal, Deeds was the only candidate left in the Democratic primary. Running unopposed, Deeds won 100% of the primary vote on June 14, 2005

Candidates

Declared
 Creigh Deeds, state senator

Withdrew
 John S. Edwards, state senator

General election

Campaign

After securing the nomination due to Edwards' withdrawal, Deeds began positioning himself as a centrist Democrat such as Mark Warner. On June 14, Deeds found out his opponent in the general election would be Bob McDonnell after McDonnell had won the Republican primary. McDonnell, who also positioned himself as a moderate campaigned against Deeds. Throughout early polling, Deeds and McDonnell started the race off tied.

The first poll of the race, conducted by Mason-Dixon showed Deeds at 34% and McDonnell barely ahead with 35% which was inside the margin of error. By the second poll which was also conducted by Mason Dixon, Deeds was behind 33%-36%. Deeds continued to campaign and was endorsed by NARAL in August 2005.

Deeds based his campaign headquarters in Charlottesville, Virginia, which was in his native Senate district. Deeds continued to lag McDonnell in the polls until the endorsement of the NRA. In late September 2005, the NRA unexpectedly endorsed Deeds, the Democrat, over McDonnell. With the new ability to claim himself as a "centrist" Democrat, Deeds had gained much needed campaign momentum.

By late October, Deeds was only 4%-5% behind McDonnell. Heading into early November, Deeds was inside the margin of error with McDonnell, behind 40%-43%. On Election day, it appeared obvious that the race was heading into a recount. Deeds trailed McDonnell by approximately 320 votes.

Polling

For the majority of the campaign, Deeds lagged McDonnell from anywhere between 3%-8%. However, in the final weeks of the campaign, Deeds picked up support due in part because of the NRA's endorsement of him. In the final poll taken by Mason Dixon and released on November 3, Deeds was only 3% behind McDonnell.

Fundraising
Deeds lagged considerably in the fundraising race. On Election Day, according to Our Campaigns, the candidates had the following amount of Cash on hand:
 McDonnell - $3,500,000
 Deeds - $1,700,000

Initial results

Recount
In late November, the Board of Elections certified Bob McDonnell as the winner by 323 votes. However, Deeds announced he would petition the courts for a recount on November 29. The recount was set to last until mid-December.

The recount started later than expected on December 20, 2005, when both campaigns were allowed to comb through ballots to make any challenges  Despite the fact that it was a recount, very few ballots were actually recounted as opposed to both campaigns making challenges to hand-fulls of ballot instead.

On December 22, 2005, however, the Board of Elections confirmed McDonnell the winner of the recount by a 360 vote margin. Despite the fact that the race was one of the closest in history, the recount had actually gained McDonnell exactly 37 votes boosting his margin from 323 votes to exactly a 360 vote lead over Deeds. Deeds called McDonnell at 7:15 that night to congratulate him on the victory.

Final results
After the recount, the final certified tally was as follows:

References

Attorney General
2005
Virginia